The 2002 Towson Tigers football team was an American football team that represented Towson University during the 2002 NCAA Division I-AA football season. Towson finished fifth in the Patriot League.

In their 11th year under head coach Gordy Combs, the Tigers compiled a 6–5 record. 

The Tigers outscored opponents 315 to 255. Their 3–4 conference record placed fifth out of eight in the Patriot League standings. 

In August 2002, as the Tigers prepared for their Patriot League football season, the university announced that it would play just two more Patriot seasons before joining the Atlantic 10 Conference for football in 2004. The new conference would give Towson a higher level of competition, more similarly-sized rivals, and the opportunity to award athletic scholarships. By joining the A-10, Towson would also gain football matchups with Delaware, Hofstra, James Madison and William & Mary, all A-10 football members that competed with Towson in other sports in their primary conference, the Colonial Athletic Association. Towson remained a Patriot League football member for 2002 and 2003.

Between the 2001 and 2002 seasons, Towson renovated and expanded its longtime home field, Minnegan Stadium, and renamed it Towson University Stadium. Towson played its home games at this facility on the university campus in Towson, Maryland.

Schedule

References

Towson
Towson Tigers football seasons
Towson Tigers football